Tenuiloricus is a genus of loriciferans known from its larval form, and occupying an uncertain taxonomic position.

References 

Protostome genera
Loricifera